Seliște is a commune in Nisporeni District, Moldova. It is composed of two villages, Păruceni and Seliște.

Notable people
 Tudor Cataraga

References

Communes of Nisporeni District